The Oregon Ducks college football team competes as part of the National Collegiate Athletic Association (NCAA) Division I Football Bowl Subdivision (FBS), and represents the University of Oregon in the North Division of the Pac-12 Conference (Pac-12). All-America selections are individual player recognitions made after each season when numerous publications release lists of their ideal team. The NCAA recognizes five All-America lists: the Associated Press (AP), American Football Coaches Association (AFCA), the Football Writers Association of America (FWAA), Sporting News (SN), and the Walter Camp Football Foundation (WCFF). In order for an honoree to earn a "consensus" selection, he must be selected as first team in three of the five lists recognized by the NCAA, and "unanimous" selections must be selected as first team in all five lists.

Since the establishment of the team in 1894, Oregon has had 29 players honored a total of 34 times as First Team All-America for their performance on the field of play. Included in these selections are 8 consensus selections, 2 of which were unanimous selections earned by LaMichael James in the 2010 season and Marcus Mariota in the 2014 season in which he won the Heisman Trophy.

Key

Selectors

Oregon Duck Football First Team All-Americans

References

Oregon
Oregon Ducks football players
Oregon Ducks football All-Americans